Jame Gumb (known by the nickname "Buffalo Bill") is a fictional character and the main antagonist of Thomas Harris's 1988 novel The Silence of the Lambs and its 1991 film adaptation, in which he is played by Ted Levine. In the film and the novel, he is a serial killer who murders overweight women and skins them so he can make a "woman suit" for himself. In the television series Clarice, he is portrayed by Simon Northwood.

Overview

Background
Gumb was born in California in 1948 or 1949. It is stated that "The 'Jame' on his birth certificate apparently was a clerical error that no one bothered to correct." Gumb's mother, an aspiring actress, went into an alcoholic decline after her career failed to materialize, and Los Angeles County placed Gumb in a foster home when he was two. The novel goes on to tell of Gumb living in foster homes until the age of 10, when he is adopted by his grandparents, who become his first victims when he impulsively kills them at age 12. He is institutionalized in Tulare Vocational Rehabilitation, a psychiatric hospital, where he learns to be a tailor. Later, Gumb has a relationship with Benjamin Raspail. After Raspail leaves him, he kills Raspail's new lover, Klaus, and flays him.

The screenplay omits Gumb's backstory, but does imply that he had a traumatic childhood. In the film, Hannibal Lecter summarizes Gumb's life thus: "Our Billy wasn't born a criminal, Clarice. He was made one through years of systematic abuse."

Both the novel and film depict Gumb as hating his own identity, though multiple characters state that Gumb is not transsexual. In the novel, multiple examples of how Gumb does not fit the psychological profile of a real transsexual are given. Gumb wants to become a woman—or at least believes he does—but repeatedly fails to qualify for gender reassignment surgery. He kills women so he can skin them and create a "woman suit" for himself, completing his "transformation". He thinks of his victims as things rather than people, often calling them "it"—hence one of his most famous lines from the film, "It rubs the lotion on its skin or else it gets the hose again." The only living thing he feels real affection for is his dog, a toy poodle named "Precious".

Modus operandi
Gumb's modus operandi (MO) is to approach a woman while pretending to be injured, ask for help, then knock her out in a surprise attack and kidnap her. He takes her to his house and leaves her in a well in his basement, where he starves her until her skin is loose enough to easily remove. In the first two cases, he leads the victims upstairs, slips nooses around their necks and pushes them from the stairs, strangling them. He then skins parts of their body (a different section on each victim), and then dumps each body into a different river, destroying any trace of evidence. 

This MO caused the homicide squad to nickname him Buffalo Bill (Buffalo Bill's Wild West show typically claimed that Buffalo Bill Cody had scalped a Cheyenne warrior). One officer quipped it was because he "skins his humps." He also inserts a Death’s-head Moth into the victim's throat because he is fascinated by the insect's metamorphosis, a process that he wants to undergo by becoming a woman. In the case of Gumb's first victim, Fredrica Bimmel, he weighs down her body, so she ends up being the third victim found. In the case of the fourth victim, he shoots rather than strangles her.

At the start of the novel, Gumb has already murdered five women. Behavioral Science Unit Chief Jack Crawford assigns gifted trainee Clarice Starling to question incarcerated serial killer Hannibal Lecter about the case. (Lecter had met Gumb while treating Raspail.) When Gumb kidnaps Catherine Martin, the daughter of U.S. Senator Ruth Martin, Lecter offers to give Starling a psychological profile of the killer in return for a transfer to a federal institution; this profile is mostly made up of cryptic clues designed to help Starling figure it out for herself. Starling eventually deduces from Lecter's riddles that Gumb knew his first victim, Frederica Bimmel, and goes to Bimmel's hometown of Belvedere, Ohio to gather information. By this time, Crawford has already found out the killer's true identity and gone with a SWAT team to his house to arrest him, but they find that it is only a business address. Meanwhile, Starling goes to the home of Bimmel's employer, Mrs. Lippman, only to find Gumb — calling himself "Jack Gordon" — living there. (Gumb had murdered Mrs. Lippman earlier.) 

When Starling sees a moth flutter by, she realizes she has found the killer and orders him to surrender. Gumb flees into the basement and stalks her with a revolver and night vision goggles. Just as he is about to shoot Starling, she hears him behind her, turns around and opens fire, killing him. In the novel, he addresses his final words to her, asking her, "How does it feel to be so beautiful?" before choking to death on his own blood.

Influences
Harris based various elements of Gumb's MO on six real-life serial killers:

 Jerry Brudos, who strangled his victims, dressed up in their clothing and kept their shoes.
 Ed Gein, who fashioned trophies and keepsakes from the bones and skin of corpses he dug up at cemeteries, as well as from two women that he murdered. He also made a female "skin suit" and skin masks.
 Ted Bundy, who pretended to be injured (using an arm-brace or crutches) as a ploy to ask his victims for help. When they helped him, he incapacitated and killed them.
 Gary M. Heidnik, who kidnapped, raped and tortured six women while holding them prisoner in a pit, where two died.
 Edmund Kemper, who, like Gumb, killed his grandparents as a teenager "just to see what it felt like".
 Gary Ridgway, the Green River Killer (still unidentified at the time of the novel's writing), who, like Gumb, dumped women's bodies in rivers and inserted foreign objects into their corpses.

Analysis
Marjorie Garber, author of Vested Interests: Cross-Dressing and Cultural Anxiety, asserts that despite the book and the film indicating that Buffalo Bill merely believes himself to be transsexual, they still imply negative connotations about transsexual identity. Garber says, "Harris's book manifests its cultural anxiety through a kind of baroque bravado of plot," and calls the book "a fable of gender dysphoria gone spectacularly awry".

Barbara Creed, writing in Screening the Male: Exploring Masculinities in the Hollywood Cinema, says that Buffalo Bill wants to become a woman "presumably because he sees femininity as a more desirable state, possibly a superior one". For Buffalo Bill, the woman is "[a] totem animal". Not only does he want to wear women's skin, he wants to become a woman; he dresses in women's clothes and tucks his penis behind his legs to appear female. Creed writes, "To experience a rebirth as woman, Buffalo Bill must wear the skin of woman not just to experience a physical transformation but also to acquire the power of transformation associated with woman's ability to give birth." Buffalo Bill wears the skin of his totem animal to assume its power.

Jack Halberstam, author of Skin Shows: Gothic Horror and the Technology of Monsters, writes, "The cause for Buffalo Bill's extreme violence against women lies not in his gender confusion or his sexual orientation but in his humanist presumption that his sex and his gender and his orientation must all match up to a mythic norm of white heterosexual masculinity." Halberstam says Buffalo Bill symbolizes a lack of ease with one's skin. He writes that the character is also a combination of Victor Frankenstein and his monster in how he is the creator gathering body parts and experimenting with his own body. Halberstam writes, "He does not understand gender as inherent, innate; he reads it only as a surface effect, a representation, an external attribute engineered into identity." Buffalo Bill challenges "the interiority of gender" by taking skin and remaking it into a costume.

Portrayal of transexuality
The film adaptation of Silence of the Lambs was criticized by some gay rights groups for its portrayal of Gumb as bisexual and transgender.

References

Hannibal Lecter characters
Characters in American novels of the 20th century
Fictional characters based on real people
Literary characters introduced in 1988
Fictional characters from California
Fictional characters with psychiatric disorders
Fictional cross-dressers
Fictional kidnappers
Fictional LGBT characters in film
Fictional serial killers
Fictional torturers
Male horror film villains
Male literary villains
Male characters in literature
LGBT villains
LGBT themes in horror fiction
Fictional LGBT characters in literature
LGBT-related controversies in film